Ammoconia is a genus of moths of the family Noctuidae.

Species
 Ammoconia aholai Fibiger, 1996
 Ammoconia anonyma Ronkay & Varga, 1984
 Ammoconia caecimacula Denis & Schiffermüller, 1775
 Ammoconia reisseri Ronkay & Varga, 1984
 Ammoconia senex Geyer, 1828
 Ammoconia senex senex
 Ammoconia senex transhamadanensis Gyulai & Ronkay, 2006

References
 Ammoconia at Markku Savela's Lepidoptera and some other life forms
 Natural History Museum Lepidoptera genus database
 Gyulai, P. & Ronkay, L. (2006). "New Noctuidae taxa from Iran and Turkey (Lepidoptera)." Esperiana Buchreihe zur Entomologie 12: 255-266.

Xyleninae
Noctuoidea genera